Astilbin is a flavanonol, a type of flavonoid. Astilbin is the (2R-trans)-isomer; neoisoastilbin is the (2S-cis)-isomer and isoastilbin is the (2R-cis)-isomer.

Natural occurrences 
Astilbin can be found in St John's wort (Hypericum perforatum, Clusiaceae, subfamily Hypericoideae, formerly often considered a full family Hypericaceae), in Dimorphandra mollis (Fava d'anta, Fabaceae), in the leaves of Harungana madagascariensis (Hypericaceae), in the rhizome of Astilbe thunbergii, in the root of Astilbe odontophylla(Saxifragaceae), in the rhizome of Smilax glabra (Chinaroot, Smilacaceae) and in the bark of Hymenaea martiana. 

 in food
It can be isolated from Kohki tea processed from Engelhardtia chrysolepis (huang-qui). It is also present in certain wines.

Uses 
Astilbin can act as an insecticide against Anticarsia gemmatalis and Spodoptera frugiperda. It shows in vitro antibacterial activity and activity on burn wound healing. Astilbin is used in traditional Chinese medicine.

Related compounds 
3'-O-Methylastilbin shows an immunosuppressive activity against contact dermatitis.

References 

Flavanonol glycosides
Flavonoid rhamnosides